Sins of Her Parent is a 1916 American silent drama film directed by Frank Lloyd and starring Gladys Brockwell, William Clifford and Carl von Schiller.

Cast
 Gladys Brockwell as Adrian Gardiner / Valerie Marchmont 
 William Clifford as Robert Carver 
 Carl von Schiller as Richard Carver 
 George Webb as Arthur Heatherway 
 Herschel Mayall as Jim McNeil 
 Jim Farley as Shorty

References

Bibliography
 Solomon, Aubrey. The Fox Film Corporation, 1915-1935: A History and Filmography. McFarland, 2011.

External links

1916 films
1916 drama films
Silent American drama films
Films directed by Frank Lloyd
American silent feature films
1910s English-language films
Fox Film films
American black-and-white films
1910s American films